Tommy Ho and Kent Kinnear were the defending champions, but Kinnear did not participate this year.  Ho partnered Sébastien Lareau, successfully defending his title.

Ho and Lareau won the title, defeating Dick Norman and Fernon Wibier 7–6, 7–6 in the final.

Seeds

  Tommy Ho /  Sébastien Lareau (champions)
  David Adams /  Leander Paes (quarterfinals)
  Joshua Eagle /  Andrew Florent (first round)
  Andrew Kratzmann /  Paul Kilderry (quarterfinals)

Draw

Draw

External links
Draw

1995 ATP Tour